Ugley is a small village and civil parish in the non-metropolitan district of Uttlesford in Essex, England. Within the parish is the village of Ugley Green,  to the south.

Ugley was first recorded in 1041 as "Uggele". It appears in the Domesday Book as "Ugghelea". The name probably means "woodland clearing of a man named Ugga."

Within Ugley there are several buildings of the 16th and 17th centuries. The Grade II* listed church, St Peter's, has a 13th-century nave and a Tudor brick tower. Orford House is a Grade II* listed building built by Edward Russell, 1st Earl of Orford, c.1700.

The village's name has been noted on lists of unusual place names.

Cycling
There is a cycling time trial course which starts close to Ugley. The village is home to several bungalows or "huts" owned by long-established cycling clubs based in Essex and Greater London.

References

See also
 Clavering hundred
 The Hundred Parishes
 List of places in Essex
 Rude Britain

Uttlesford
Villages in Essex
Civil parishes in Essex